Burmannia may refer to:

Burmannia (plant), a genus of mycoheterotrophic flowering plants in the family Burmanniaceae
Burmannia marmorellus, a species of moth in the monotypic genus Burmannia